Rebecca Love Kourlis (born November 11, 1952) is a former justice of the Colorado Supreme Court.

Early life and education
Kourlis was born in Colorado Springs, Colorado, and is the daughter of former Governor John Arthur Love. She received her primary school education at Graland Country Day School in Denver, class of 1967. In 1973, she graduated with distinction from Stanford University and in 1976 earned a law degree from Stanford Law School.

Career
Kourlis started her career at the Denver law firm of Davis Graham & Stubbs and later set up a private practice in Craig, Colorado.

Kourlis was appointed to the state Supreme Court in May 1995 by Democratic Governor Roy Romer. She previously served as a district court judge and worked in private practice in Colorado. She was mentioned as a potential nominee of George W. Bush to the U.S. Supreme Court by Senator Ken Salazar. On December 5, 2005, she announced her retirement from the Colorado Supreme Court effective January 10, 2006.  In January 2006, she became Executive Director of University of Denver Institute for the Advancement of the American Legal System.

Awards
 American Bar Association (ABA) Justice Center's John Marshall Award, 2012
 Citizens of the West, 2010 (Awarded with Tom Kourlis)
 ABA Yegge Award for Outstanding Contribution in the Field of Judicial Administration, 2009
 Regis University Civis Princeps Award, 2008
 Colorado Judicial Institute's Judicial Independence Award, 2006

Personal life
Kourlis is married to Thomas A. Kourlis, a rancher and former commissioner of agriculture for the state of Colorado.  They have three children.

References

See also
 George W. Bush Supreme Court candidates
 List of justices of the Colorado Supreme Court

1952 births
Living people
20th-century American women lawyers
20th-century American lawyers
20th-century American women judges
20th-century American judges
21st-century American women
21st-century American women judges
21st-century American judges
American women judges
Justices of the Colorado Supreme Court
Lawyers from Denver
People from Colorado Springs, Colorado
Stanford University alumni
Stanford Law School alumni